Natalya Yurkevich (born 9 December 1967) is a Kazakhstani dressage rider.  She was scheduled to compete for Kazakh team at the 2014 World Equestrian Games but was forced to withdraw after her horse Donpetro failed to pass the compulsory vet check.

She represented Kazakhstan at two Asian Games.

References

Living people
1967 births
Kazakhstani female equestrians
Equestrians at the 2006 Asian Games
Equestrians at the 2014 Asian Games
Asian Games competitors for Kazakhstan
Kazakhstani dressage riders